Mariano Bombarda (born 10 September 1972) is an Argentinian former professional footballer who played as a striker.

Early life
Bombarda was born in Cádiz, Spain, to an Italian father and Argentinian mother. Due to the profession of his father, who was a naval engineer, his family moved a lot and in addition to Spain he has also lived in Italy, Argentina and Venezuela.

Career
As part of an exchange program in 1989 for students from Venezuela, he played for ACV in Assen, Netherlands, where he entered the under-19 team. For two years after, Bombarda played in the youth team and sometimes in the reserve team of the Argentinian club Huracán, after which he returned to the Netherlands to play for ACV and study higher education.

After impressing in the first team of the amateur club, Bombarda was scouted by Groningen. He made his professional debut in the 1994–95 season for the club when he replaced Marcel Boudesteijn in the match against Heerenveen on 26 August 1994.

Bombarda then played for Metz, before returning to Groningen. Later on, he joined Willem II, where he scored a goal after just 28.21 seconds in a 4–3 defeat against Sparta Prague in the 1999–2000 UEFA Champions League. 

Afterwards, he played for Feyenoord and Tenerife. At the latter, he retired from football after one season, in 2005.

After football
Bombarda has since worked as a youth team coach at Willem II.

References

External links
  Profile

1972 births
Living people
Footballers from Cádiz
Citizens of Argentina through descent
Argentine people of Spanish descent
Argentine people of Italian descent
Argentine footballers
Association football forwards
Asser Christelijke Voetbalvereniging players
Club Atlético Huracán footballers
FC Groningen players
FC Metz players
Willem II (football club) players
Feyenoord players
CD Tenerife players
Eredivisie players
Ligue 1 players
Segunda División players
Argentine expatriate footballers
Argentine expatriate sportspeople in the Netherlands
Expatriate footballers in the Netherlands
Argentine expatriate sportspeople in France
Expatriate footballers in France
Argentine expatriate sportspeople in Venezuela